The 1926 Ice Hockey European Championship was the 11th edition of the ice hockey tournament for European countries associated to the International Ice Hockey Federation.

The tournament was played between January 11, and January 19, 1926, in Davos, Switzerland, and it was won by Switzerland.

Nine teams entered the competition and were divided into three groups of three for the preliminary round.  The preliminary round was scheduled over the first three days, the “qualification for the final round” was contested in one day, and the “final” round was scheduled over the last three days.  The tournament was however extended by an additional two days to accommodate a three-way tie-break round, which became necessary due to the three-way tie on points for the gold medal.

Preliminary round
Group winners advanced directly to the Final Round.

Second-place teams advanced to the Qualification for Final Round.

Third-place teams advanced to the consolation round.

Group A

January 11

January 12

January 13

Standings Group A

Group B

The game between Austria and France was delayed by one day due to the late arrival of the French team.  

January 12

January 13

Standings Group B

Group C

January 11

January 12

January 13

Standings Group C

Qualification for Final Round
Winner advanced to Final Round.

Third-place team advanced to Game for 6th-7th places.

January 14

January 14

January 14

Standings Qualification for Final Round

Consolation round
Winner advanced to Game for 6th-7th places.

January 14

January 15

January 16

Standings Consolation round

Final Round
Although goal ratio was first tie-break criterion, a special three-team tie-break round was held instead, because the tie was for the gold medal.
  
January 15

January 16

January 17

Standings Final Round

Consolation round 6-7 Place

January 17

Tie-break Round

January 18

January 19

Standings Tie-break Round

Top goalscorers

Heinrich Meng (Switzerland), 13 goals
C. Ross Cuthbert (Great Britain), 13 goals

Final standings

References 
 Lion in Winter: A Complete Record of Great Britain at the Olympic, World and European Championships
 Euro Championship 1926

1926
Ice Hockey European Championships
Sport in Davos
Euro
January 1926 sports events